Karimenga is a village and a farming community in the West Mamprusi Municipality in the Bunkpurugu/Nakpanduri District in the North East Region of Ghana. On its hills, is the location of a two-bedroom apartment which was the hideout of Dr. Kwame Nkrumah which was once known as “Kwame Nkrumah Guest House”.

History 
In the 18th century, the village was called Timeema meaning "Let's build" in the local dialect. Satanbla who was a hunter discovered the place and built a trend. He was later joined by others from the Wulugu village because of how fertile the land was. The people who joined him would ask "how much to build" and Satanbla would say "Timeema". Because he was the first to discover the place, he became the village leader.

Infrastructures 

 Primary school
 Guest house
 Mosque
 Kasajan Quarry
 The Green House

References 

North East Region, Ghana
Communities in Ghana